Jancee Dunn (born May 18, 1966) is a journalist, author and former VJ. She is now a contributing editor at O, The Oprah Magazine but is mostly known for her work at Rolling Stone, where she worked from 1989 to 2003.

Background 

She grew up in Chatham, New Jersey and attended University of Delaware but dropped out of her bachelor's course in English. Her husband is the print and Internet journalist Tom Vanderbilt. They have one daughter, Sylvie Rein, born May 5, 2009.

Rolling Stone 
Dunn has written for Rolling Stone since 1989; her first cover story was with Liz Phair. She has covered celebrities including Green Day, Bono, Madonna, Dolly Parton and Brad Pitt for the magazine.

Other work 

Dunn was also one of the original on-air personalities for MTV2, from 1996 until 2001. She writes for a number of publications, including O, The Oprah Magazine, Vogue, Jane, The New York Times, and others. For five years, she was a sex columnist at GQ under the pseudonym of Dr. Sooth. She contributed to Good Morning America between 2001 and 2002.

Dunn is also the author of But Enough About Me: A Jersey Girl's Unlikely Adventures Among the Absurdly Famous (titled But Enough About Me: From Eighties Geek To Rock & Roll Chic outside North America), published in June 2006 by HarperCollins. It was an autobiography that chronicled her transformation from a suburban girl to contributing editor at one of the most glamorous magazines in the world. The book received a positive review from Publishers Weekly.

Books 

 But Enough About Me (2006)
 But Enough About Me: How a Small-Town Girl Went from Shag Carpet to the Red Carpet (2006)
 But Enough about Me: Adventures in Celebsville (2007)
 Don't You Forget about Me (2008)
 Why Is My Mother Getting a Tattoo?: And Other Questions I Wish I Never Had to Ask (2009)
 How Not to Hate Your Husband After Kids (2017)

References

External links
 Interview with NPR's On the Media
Article in The Telegraph
 Interview with the OMG chronicles

Living people
1966 births
20th-century American journalists
University of Delaware alumni
21st-century American writers
21st-century American women writers
20th-century American women